Fultondale High School is a combined middle school and high school in the Birmingham, Alabama suburb of Fultondale. It is one of fourteen high schools in the Jefferson County School System. School colors are navy blue and Burnt orange, and the athletic teams are called the Wildcats. Fultondale competes in AHSAA Class 4A athletics.

Student profile 
Enrollment in grades 6-12 for the 2013-14 school year is 637 students. Approximately 48% of students are white, 31% are African-American, 19% are Hispanic, and 2% are multiracial. Roughly 62% of students qualify for free or reduced price lunch.

Fultondale has a graduation rate of 73%. Approximately 73% of its students meet or exceed state proficiency standards in mathematics, and 85% meet or exceed standards in reading. The average ACT score for Fultondale students is 24.

History
Students in grades 10-12 formerly attended Gardendale High School. In 1965, a new school was built at the present Fultondale site and was named New Castle High School, with a vocational building being added in 1967. In the fall of 1972, students from Fultondale Elementary and the Smithfield area merged with the students at New Castle High School. The Jefferson County Board of Education then changed the school's name to Fultondale High School.

At the time of this merger, Jack Hazelrig was the principal at Fultondale Elementary. He was appointed by the board to be the first principal of Fultondale High School. The school housed grades 7-12 in its first year but was changed to an 8-12 school the next year. Fultondale High saw its first graduating class with the class of 1973.

Starting in the 2013-2014 school year, 6th graders from Fultondale Elementary began attending Fultondale High due to overcrowding at the elementary school.

On January 25, 2021, the town of Fultondale was struck by an EF3 tornado. The high school sustained significant structural damage, and athletic facilities were destroyed.

The school had to be demolished due to the tornado damage.

Notable alumni 

 ArDarius Stewart, Wide receiver for the B.C. Lions

Athletics
Fultondale competes in AHSAA Class 4A athletics and fields teams in the following sports:
 Baseball
 Basketball
 Cheerleading
 Cross Country
 Football
 Golf
 Indoor Track & Field
 Outdoor Track & Field
 Soccer
 Softball
 Volleyball
 Wrestling
Fultondale won state championships in wrestling in 1992, 1994, and 1995.

References

External links
Fultondale High School website
Fultondale High School profile on SchoolDigger
Fultondale High School profile on Niche

High schools in Birmingham, Alabama
Schools in Jefferson County, Alabama
Public high schools in Alabama
Public middle schools in Alabama
Educational institutions established in 1965
1965 establishments in Alabama